A majo is a male member of the lower class of Spanish society in the 18th and 19th centuries.

Majo may also refer to:
×Canmea 'Majo', an intergeneric hybrid cultivar of the nothogenus xCanmea in the Bromeliad family

People with the surname
Giuseppe de Majo (1697-1771), Italian composer and organist
Gian Francesco de Majo (1732-1770), Italian composer active during the mid to late 1700s
Joan Majó (born 1938), Spanish politician
Montserrat Majo (born 1959), Spanish swimmer who competed in the 1976 Summer Olympics

See also
 Maja (disambiguation)

hr:Maja